Zehender is a surname. Notable people with the surname include:

August Zehender (1903–1945), German World War II officer
Daniel Zehender (died 1500), Roman Catholic prelate
Gabriel Zehender, German painter and printer
Carl Wilhelm von Zehender (1819–1916), German ophthalmologist